Colotis chrysonome, the golden Arab tip, is a butterfly in the family Pieridae. It is found in the Mauritania, northern Senegal, Mali, Burkina Faso, Nigeria, Niger, the central and eastern part of the Sahara, Sudan, Ethiopia, Somalia, southern Arabia, northern Uganda, Kenya, northern Tanzania, Israel and Jordan. The habitat consists of arid savanna.

The wingspan is 33–38 mm. Adults have a distinctive orange-golden colour. The forewings of the males have a white base.

The larvae feed on Maerua species.

References

Butterflies described in 1829
chrysonome